Neurosis and Human Growth: The Struggle Toward Self-Realization is the magnum opus of German-American psychoanalyst Karen Horney.  In it she outlines her theory of neurosis.

In Horney's view, the key difference between neurosis and healthy growth is the difference between compulsive actions fueled by anxiety and spontaneous actions fueled by one's full range of emotions.  If a person grows up able to maintain his or her spontaneity, that person grows up by a process which Horney calls self-realization.  Horney describes self-realization as the development of a person's given potentialities, and compares it with the process of an acorn growing, given fertile soil, into a tree.

The principal subject of the book, however, is what happens when a person's spontaneity is crushed in early life.  The person will slowly lose touch with that spontaneity or "real self" and develop, instead, a reactive self which is constructed to respond to dangers of various kinds (see True self and false self).  If a child's early environment is such that the child grows up seeing the world as basically hostile, compulsive actions will predominate and the child will grow up devoted to allaying anxiety.  This development and its consequences for the adult personality are what Horney calls neurosis.

Horney devotes thirteen chapters to an analysis of the neurotic development in all its nuances and the various forms it can take as a person grows into adulthood, one chapter to the process of overcoming neurosis in therapy, and one chapter to how her theory compares and contrasts with classical psychoanalytic theory.

Influence 

This book was the inspiration for Robert C. Tucker's biographies of Joseph Stalin, whom Tucker describes as a Horneyan neurotic.

Horney influenced Bill W., co-founder of Alcoholics Anonymous and inspirer of Neurotics Anonymous, who had this to say in a letter to another AA member:

See also 

 Schizoid personality disorder

Notes

References 
Horney, Karen (1950). Neurosis and Human Growth: The Struggle Toward Self-Realization. W. W. Norton & Company, Inc. 

1950 non-fiction books
Psychology books
W. W. Norton & Company books